The Ch. Devi Lal State Institute Of Engineering & Technology (abbreviated CDLSIET) is a public government engineering institution located in Sirsa, Haryana. It is among the four engineering college run by the Government of Haryana, the other being  State Institute of Engineering & Technology, Nilokheri (Karnal)  , Rao Bijender Singh State Institute of Engineering & Technology, Rewari and Ch. Ranbir Singh State Institute of Engineering & Technology, Jhajjar.

History
The college was inaugurated on 26 September 2003. The college is named after the former Deputy Prime Minister of India , Chaudhary Devi Lal, who was also the former Chief Minister of Haryana.

Location
The college is situated in Panniwala Mota, district Sirsa, Haryana.

Courses
Computer Science & Engineering
Electronics Communication & Engineering
Electrical Technology
Mechanical Engineering
Civil Engineering

See also
 List of universities in India
 Universities and colleges in India
 Education in India
 List of institutions of higher education in Haryana

References

External links
 Official Website
 cdlmgec@fb
 cdlmgecStudents@fb
 cdlmgec@youth4work

Engineering colleges in Haryana
Educational institutions established in 2003
2003 establishments in Haryana
Government universities and colleges in India
Sirsa district